Daniel Marney is a professional footballer who played as a forward in the Football League for Brighton & Hove Albion and Southend United on loan. He dropped into non-League football with Crawley Town on loan in 2003, before joining them on a permanent basis in 2004. He went on to join Eastbourne Borough, Worthing on loan and Bognor Regis Town.

Career
Marney started his career as a youth player at Brighton & Hove Albion, making his debut on 10 August 2001 in the First Division against Burnley in the 3–1 away win replacing Bobby Zamora, in 86th minute. He joined Southend United on loan in December 2002, making his debut in the 3–1 away defeat to Torquay United in the Third Division, replacing Tony Scully in the 76th minute. He went on to make 17 appearances for Southend in the Third Division, before joining Crawley Town on loan the following season, 2003–04 on loan. Marney signed on a permanent basis for Crawley Town in April 2004.

He signed for Eastbourne Borough in the summer of 2005, before joining Worthing on loan in January 2006. Having made 35 appearances for the team, Eastbourne released Marney at the end of the 2006 season. Marney then joined Bognor Regis Town, before being released in November 2006.

References

External links

1981 births
Living people
English footballers
Footballers from Sidcup
Brighton & Hove Albion F.C. players
Southend United F.C. players
Crawley Town F.C. players
Eastbourne Borough F.C. players
Bognor Regis Town F.C. players
Worthing F.C. players
English Football League players
National League (English football) players
Association football forwards